The UCD Law Society is one of the largest student societies in Europe. Established in 1911 as 'The Legal and Economic Society', as of 2009 it had approximately 4100 members drawn from the various faculties of the university. Weekly Tuesday night debates during term are the society's core activity. Individuals who have addressed the society include President of Ireland Michael D. Higgins, former Irish Taoiseach (Prime Minister), Bertie Ahern and President of the European Council Donald Tusk. The society's motto is "Ar son na Córa" (in favour of justice).

Activities

House debates
As one of the two debating unions in University College Dublin, the society gathers once a week to debate topical motions relating to students and other national issues of importance. This is the main activity of the society, typically taking place on Tuesday evenings in the Fitzgerald Chamber in the New Student Centre. Guest speakers related to the topic are often invited to engage with the motion and address the students. Attendance at house debates varies weekly, with debates attracting anywhere between 30 and 300 people. Motions often range from Northern Ireland politics to the relevance of the Students' Union.

The Law Society organised the first live Irish Presidential Debate which took place on Nominations day 2011 in Theatre L. The largest recorded attendance at a Society debate was the second Lisbon Treaty referendum debate on 28 September 2009, which had an attendance of over 1,000 students in O'Reilly Hall, Belfield.

Guest speakers and honorary life memberships
The Law Society also regularly invites notable speakers to deliver individual addresses to the society. Guest speakers have included former Minister for Justice, Michael McDowell in October 2009 and the former lead prosecutor of Slobodan Milosevic, Sir Geoffrey Nice QC in March 2010. In 2017, the vice president of the European Commission Frans Timmermans received an honorary lifetime membership, as did Jean-Claude Trichet, former president of the ECB.

The society awards honorary life memberships to individuals who have contributed significantly to their chosen field of human endeavour. The presentation of honorary life membership also affords the recipient with an opportunity to address the assembled members of the society.

Recipients of honorary life memberships have included actors Patrick J. Adams, Sir Christopher Lee, Martin Sheen, John C. McGinley, Dirk Benedict, Jeremy Irons, and the late David Kelly and Leslie Nielsen, comedians Colin Murphy, Dan Antopolski and Bill Bailey, authors Tucker Max, Jung Chang and Noam Chomsky, political figures Ken Livingstone and Bill Clinton, sportspeople Cristiano Ronaldo, Pauleta, Jimmy White, Brian O’Driscoll and Paul O’Connell, dancer Michael Flatley, supermodel Erin O’Connor and Nobel laureate Seamus Heaney.

Free speech

Controversies
The society is committed to maintaining a strong policy of free speech, a policy which it has, on occasion, found difficult to maintain. In 2008, the radical French politician Jean-Marie Le Pen was invited to address the society concerning the federalisation of the European Union. This event was essentially struck down by university authorities after it denounced the move in response to queries from the national media. Many other debates have seen significant protests from left-wing student movements. Their policy of "no TDs on campus" due to perceived government support of university tuition fees has often conflicted with invitations to Fianna Fáil TDs on unrelated debate motions. Protests occurred in 2008 when government minister Éamon Ryan arrived to address the society. and again in 2009 when Bertie Ahern chaired a debate.

In November 2015, Robert O'Neill, the soldier who shot Osama Bin Laden, was invited to address the society. The event attracted controversy, and during the week of the event posters and online advertising of the event disappeared without explanation. The morning of the address however, posters appeared promising a 'mystery guest' and depicting the silhouette of a navy seal. Robert O'Neill duly gave his address to a large audience.

Moot court competitions

Cecil Lavery Moot Court Competition
The Cecil Lavery is a moot court competition named after one of the society's former auditors, a former Attorney General and Supreme Court Judge. It was initiated in 2005 and has continued as the principal moot court competition in UCD, with the winners going forward to represent UCD in the Holland & Knight National Moot Court Competition. The competition is organised in a knockout format, with written submissions and oral hearings adjudicated upon. A grand final is held in the UCD Sutherland School of Law in February each year with senior members of the Irish judiciary invited to adjudicate. The chair was traditionally held by the Hon. Mr Justice Lavan, a former auditor of the society. For many years prior to his death, he served as senior judge of the High Court.

Thomas A. Finlay Moot Court Intervarsity
The Thomas A. Finlay Moot Court Intervarsity is an international moot court competition named after the former Irish Chief Justice, Thomas A. Finlay. Founded in 2009, it has attracted teams from across the British Isles and beyond.

Competitive debating

The Law Society's record in competitive debating includes a number of wins in international debating competitions and victory in The Irish Times and Mace debating competitions as well as international and national intervarsities. The society has sent delegates to the World Universities Debating Championship annually and the European Universities Debating Championship, including reaching the quarter finals in both competitions. In 1987 and 2006, UCD hosted the World Universities Debating Championship.

Schools' debating
The society also promotes and organises competitive debating in schools across Ireland through the Law Society Schools' Mace and the Junior Schools Debating Competition which reaches secondary schools throughout the country.

History

Legal and Economic Society
The society was founded in 1911 as the Legal & Economic Society. The professor and politician, J.G. Swift McNeill, gave the inaugural address. Early committee members included Thomas Kettle, Conor Maguire, Thomas Arkins and Arthur Cox. The society ran a number of small legal debates in its early years and struggled to maintain its activity during the War of Independence and Civil War.

Legal Society
The society was renamed the Legal Society in 1924 and had a brief resurgence of activity under the auditorship of J.C. Flood. In 1926 however, the society ran into trouble once again.

Law Society
In 1935, the society was reconstituted as the Law Society, tasked with organising legal debates and representing legal students. Early auditors and members included Thomas Finlay and T.F. O'Higgins. In 1946, the son of Conor Maguire, Peter D. Maguire, became auditor, addressing the society on the importance of peace through the United Nations. The Taoiseach, Éamon de Valera, attended.

Throughout the 1950s and 1960s, the society began to challenge the Literary & Historical Society for dominance in University debate. A debating tour to universities in Britain was organised annually. The tour eventually ceased in Colm Allen's session due to security concerns following IRA violence in the Troubles.

During the 1970s, the society won the Irish Times twice, as well as the Irish Mace, both times with auditor Conor Gearty. It would continue the success throughout the 1980s and 1990s as the society won the Irish Times twice more. The 1980s and 1990s also saw an increase in the scale of the society's activities as it began to host larger debates. The notorious criminal, Martin Cahill, addressed the society in 1987 and for many years the society held the Guinness World Record for the longest ever continuous debate.

The 1990s saw the society expand its membership base beyond law students; reaching out to the entire campus. Throughout the 1990s and 2000s, the society continually grew, first in hundreds, then in thousands. The society reached virtually saturation point in 2010, when prior to the awarding of Honorary Life Membership to television presenter Jeremy Kyle, it signed up its 5,000th member for that session.

In the 2010s, the society gained national news coverage when welcoming figures such as Judge Judy and Donald Tusk. By 2017, the society had reached 5,600 members before winning the Irish Times back-to-back, in 2017 and 2018.

Administration

Auditor and committee
The Law Society is run by a committee of selected members, each with a specific remit. The committee is chosen by the auditor, who is elected for a single year term by the enrolled membership of the society. The auditor is the head of the committee and responsible for the day-to-day running of the society. The society's sessions usually begin in late March or early April, following the annual general meeting, which includes reports from the auditor, treasurer, librarian and senior legal assessor. At the annual general meeting the results of the auditorial election are declared and the new auditor appointed following the passing over of the chain of office.

Patron, president and vice-presidents
These roles are largely ceremonial. As of 2019, the patron of the Law Society was Professor Andrew J. Deeks, the President of UCD, while the president of the society is the Dean of the School of Law, Professor Imelda Maher. There are a number of vice-presidents, who are almost exclusively all international legal figures and address the society upon their appointment to the position. Notable vice-presidents have included the Chief Justice of Canada, the Hon. Ms Justice Beverly McLachlin PC, Associate Justice of the U.S. Supreme Court, Antonin Scalia, the former President of the U.K. Supreme Court, Lord Phillips of Worth Matravers, Professor Joseph Raz, Baroness Hale of Richmond and former Irish President and U.N. Human Rights Commissioner Mary Robinson.

Finances
The society has received an increased amount of funding in recent years, due to corporate sponsorship and college contributions. The society's accounts are presented by the Honorary Treasurer at each annual general meeting; the society's turnover is in the region of €100,000 annually. The society receives funding from the University Societies Council and also seeks corporate sponsorship to cover the costs of each session. As of 2019, the title sponsors of the society were the Irish law firm, Matheson Ormsby Prentice.

Notable auditors

 Conor Gearty (67th session), Rausling Professor of Human Rights Law, London School of Economics
 Michael McDowell (62nd session), Tánaiste, Minister for Justice and Attorney General
 Hugh Geoghegan (50th session), Irish Supreme Court Justice 
 Hugh O'Flaherty (47th session), Irish Supreme Court Justice 
 Donal Barrington (39th session), Supreme Court Justice
 Declan Costello (35th session), Attorney General and President of the High Court
 Thomas Finlay (32nd session), Chief Justice of Ireland
 Cecil Lavery (6th session), Attorney General and Supreme Court Justice

References

External links

University College Dublin
Student debating societies in Ireland